Kaui Hart Hemmings is an American writer. She is best known for her 2007 novel The Descendants, which was adapted into an award-winning film.

Biography 
Kaui Hart Hemmings was born and raised in Hawaii. She attended Punahou School for high school, graduating in 1994. She attended Colorado College and graduated in 1998. She earned her M.F.A. at Sarah Lawrence College in 2002. She was one of Stanford's 2002 Stegner Fellows.

Her debut novel, The Descendants, was published in 22 countries and was a New York Times bestseller. It was adapted into the 2011 film The Descendants, starring George Clooney and written by Alexander Payne, Nat Faxon, and Jim Rash.

Hemmings previously published a collection of stories, House of Thieves. She has written two other novels for adults, The Possibilities (2014) and How to Party With an Infant (2016), and one for young readers, Juniors (2015). In 2019, she published her novel Testimony from Your Perfect Girl.

Bibliography
Short story collections
House of Thieves (2005) 
Novels
The Descendants (2007) 
The Possibilities (2014) 
Juniors (for young adults) (2015) 
How to Party With an Infant (2016) 
Testimony from Your Perfect Girl (2019)

Reviews

References

External links

Living people
21st-century American novelists
American women short story writers
American women novelists
Colorado College alumni
Sarah Lawrence College alumni
American women screenwriters
Novelists from Hawaii
21st-century American women writers
21st-century American short story writers
Screenwriters from Hawaii
21st-century American screenwriters
Stegner Fellows
1975 births